Anthony Bourdain: No Reservations is an American travel and food show that originally aired on the Travel Channel in the United States and on Discovery Travel & Living internationally. In it, host Anthony Bourdain visits various countries and cities, as well as places within the U.S., where he explores local culture and cuisine. The format and content of the show is similar to Bourdain's 2001–2002 Food Network series, A Cook's Tour. The show premiered in 2005 and concluded its nine-season run with the series finale episode (Brooklyn) on November 5, 2012.

The special episode Anthony Bourdain in Beirut that aired between Seasons 2 and 3 was nominated for an Emmy Award for Outstanding Informational Programming in 2007.  In 2009 and 2011, the series won the Emmy for "Outstanding Cinematography For Nonfiction Programming".

Episodes

Season 1

Season 2
Three special episodes were aired in 2006, one before the season, and two after.

Season 3
Season 3 was aired in two parts: six episodes in the winter of 2007, and nine in the summer and autumn of 2007. Two special episodes were also aired in 2007, book-ending the regular episodes.

Season 4
As with Season 3, Season 4 was aired in two parts: nine episodes in the winter of 2008, and ten in the summer of 2008. Various sources have referred to the summer episodes as Season 5, but in a post on his blog regarding the September 1, 2008 episode, Bourdain refers to it as the final episode of Season 4.  One special episode followed the regular 2008 episodes.

Season 5

Season 5 is another split season, with 10 episodes aired in the winter of 2009, and 10 episodes following in the summer.

Season 6

Season 7

Season 8

Season 9

After Bourdain announced in May 2012 that he would be leaving to do a new show for CNN entitled Anthony Bourdain: Parts Unknown, the Travel Channel suspended Season 8 and repackaged the remaining seven episodes left to air as "The Final Tour" to capitalize on the publicity surrounding his departure. In addition to the seven episodes from Season 8, three episodes — "Sex, Drugs And Rock & Roll", "Seven Deadly Sins" and "Off The Charts" — made out of old footage, were reedited to look like new and added to Season 9.

Related

Distribution

Home video releases 
As of March 2013, Travel Channel has released seven collections of the series on DVD. Despite that the series has been shot mostly with high-definition video cameras, it is not available for purchase in high definition format like Blu-ray.

In March 2013, Netflix canceled instant streaming of the show without explanation, but restored a 25 episode "No Reservations Collection" in October 2014. Hulu offers 5 episodes from season 7 and 8

The DVD releases do not have subtitles enabled for the hearing impaired. (Broadcast episodes do have closed-captioning available.)

 Collection 1 (4 discs) (2005)
 Disc 1- Paris, New Jersey
 Disc 2- Sicily, Las Vegas
 Disc 3- New Zealand, Malaysia
 Disc 4- Iceland, Vietnam
 Collection 2 (3 discs) (2006)
 Disc 1- Sweden, Puerto Rico, Quebec, U.S./Mexico Border
 Disc 2- India (Rajasthan), India (Kolkata/Mumbai), Korea, Indonesia, Ireland
 Disc 3- Ghana, Namibia, Lebanon, Pacific Northwest
 Collection 3 (3 discs) (2007)
 Disc 1- Russia, Los Angeles, New York, Shanghai, Hong Kong
 Disc 2- French Polynesia, Cleveland, Brazil, Argentina
 Disc 3- Singapore, South Carolina, Berlin, Tuscany
 Collection 4 (3 discs) (2008)
 Disc 1- Vancouver, New Orleans, London/Edinburgh, Greek Islands, Jamaica, Hawaii
 Disc 2- Into the Fire, Laos, Tokyo, Uruguay, Colombia
 Disc 3- Spain, Egypt, Saudi Arabia, Washington D.C., US Southwest, Bonus Features
 Collection 5 - Part 1 (3 discs) (2010)
 Disc 1- Romania, So Long Summer, Mexico, Venice
 Disc 2- Azores, Chicago, Food Porn, Philippines
 Disc 3- Disappearing Manhattan, Sri Lanka, Sardinia, Chile, Bonus Materials (Alternate Universe)
 Collection 5 - Part 2 (3 discs) (2011)
 Disc 1- Australia, Buffalo/Baltimore/Detroit, Down on the Street, San Francisco
 Disc 2- Thailand, Montana, NYC Outer Boroughs, Vietnam: No Place Like Home
 Disc 3- Brittany, Obsessed, Provence, Bonus Materials (Alternate Universe)
 Collection 6 - Part 1 (3 discs) (November 29, 2011)
 Disc 1- Panama, Istanbul, Prague, New York Hudson Valley, Ecuador
 Disc 2- Harbin China, Maine, Food Porn 2, Caribbean Island Hopping, Heartland
 Disc 3- Bonus Features: Burning Questions, Techniques Special, Holiday Special
 Collection 6 - Part 2 (2 discs) (2012)
 Disc 1- Where it all Began, Liberia, Dubai, Rome, Madrid
 Disc 2- Kerala, India, Paris 100, Back to Beirut, Bonus Features (What were we thinking, Making of India)
 Collection 7 (3 discs) (2012)
 Disc 1- Haiti, Cambodia, Nicaragua, Vienna, Ozarks
 Disc 2- Brazil: The Amazon, Boston, Japan: Hokkaido, Cuba, Macau
 Disc 3- Naples, El Bulli, Ukraine, Kurdistan, Cajun Country

Broadcast syndication
In 2019, Ovation obtained broadcast and digital rights in the United States for seasons five through eight of the series, while season 9 has been released exclusively on the network's lifestyle and travel streaming service JOURNY and has yet to be aired on TV.

Notable guests

On the Season 3 New York City episode, Andrew Zimmern appeared in one segment. Bourdain appeared as a guest on the New York City episode of Zimmern's Travel Channel show Bizarre Foods with Andrew Zimmern, which aired the same day. The two shows were edited such that one show led nearly seamlessly into the other.
Bourdain's wife Ottavia Busia, who is a native of Sardinia, Italy, appeared anonymously on the Season 3 Tuscany episode, as one of the disgruntled diners eating the food he prepares. She is also featured prominently in the Season 5 episode when the Bourdains visit Sardinia. She was also featured in the Season 6 Rome and Season 7 Naples episodes.
Bourdain's brother Chris was his companion on the Season 4 Uruguay episode. In addition, Chris and his family appears in the first Holiday episode.
Chefs who appeared on the program include Ferran and Albert Adrià, Éric Ripert, Gastón Acurio, Thomas Keller, Jacques Pépin, Mario Batali, Masaharu Morimoto, José Andrés, David Chang, Marco Pierre White, Jun Sakamoto, Wylie Dufresne, Homaro Cantu, Michael Symon, Juan Mari Arzak and Elena Arzak, Andoni Aduriz, April Bloomfield, Fergus Henderson, Gabrielle Hamilton, Jiro Ono, Scott Conant, Chris Cosentino, Pino Posteraro, Hidekazu Tojo, Vikram Vij, Edward Tuson, Martin Picard, Joël Robuchon, Alvin Leung, David Munoz, Olivier Rollinger, Paul Kahan, Chris Cheung, Michael Lomonaco, McDang, Chef Wan, Matt Moran, Neil Perry, Luke Mangan and Emeril Lagasse.
Musicians who appeared on the program include Alice Cooper, Ted Nugent, Queens of the Stone Age, Black Keys, Marky Ramone, David Johansen, Alejandro Escovedo, Neon Indian, Talib Kweli, The Sword, Sleigh Bells, Sami Yaffa, Los Pericos, Koo Nimo, Rocola Bacalao, and Paul Godfrey from Morcheeba. The show's holiday specials also included performances by Queens of the Stone Age, Norah Jones and Das Racist.
Authors who appeared on the program include Jim Harrison, António Lobo Antunes, Chuck Palahniuk, Jerry Stahl, Harvey Pekar, George Pelecanos, Daniel Woodrell, Ian Rankin, Michael Ruhlman, Gary Shteyngart, Evan Rail and Nick Tosches.
Actors who appeared on the program include Bill Murray, Mammootty, Sean Penn and Michael K. Williams.
Politicians who appeared include German politician Gregor Gysi  and Sicily's governor Salvatore Cuffaro.
Athletes' appearances include the Puerto Rico episode where Tony boxed with and had lunch with boxer Miguel Cotto. The Vancouver episode when Tony visits EA Sports Canada and NBA superstar Kevin Durant can be seen getting his motion capture suit adjusted; in addition, professional snowboarder Ross Rebagliati gives snowboarding lessons to Tony's producer.

Awards and nominations

References

External links 
 Official website
 Series schedule
 
 Zero Point Zero Production Inc.
 TV.com Homepage
Bourdain's quail of a time. February 7, 2009. 
 Blogs of War: Anthony Bourdain Talks Travel, Food, and War

2005 American television series debuts
2000s American cooking television series
2010s American cooking television series
2000s American reality television series
2010s American reality television series
2012 American television series endings
English-language television shows
Food travelogue television series
Television series by Fremantle (company)
Travel Channel original programming